Clyde Frederick Vollmer (September 24, 1921 – October 2, 2006) was an American professional baseball outfielder, who played in 685 games in Major League Baseball (MLB) for the Cincinnati Reds, Washington Senators and Boston Red Sox. During the  season with the Red Sox, his hot hitting earned him the nickname "Dutch the Clutch."

Early career
Vollmer was born in Cincinnati, Ohio. As a youth, he played for the Bridgetown Baseball League in Hamilton County, Ohio; Vollmer was a leader on the team that won the Hamilton County Grade School baseball championship in 1935, according to a publication called "News of the Reds" dated May 20, 1947.

Professional career
Vollmer graduated from Western Hills High School in 1938 and signed as a free agent with the Cincinnati Reds the following year.

Vollmer did not appear for the Reds until May 31, 1942. After playing only 12 games, the 21-year-old joined the Army. He fought in World War II for three years. After his discharge, Vollmer returned to the Reds.

Vollmer played in the major leagues over ten seasons between 1942 and 1954. His torrid stretch as a member of the 1951 Red Sox lasted from July 6–28. In 21 games played, Vollmer had 31 hits, including 13 home runs, four doubles, one triple, 40 runs batted in (RBI), and 25 runs scored. The streak saw him raise his batting average from .267 to .287 and included a three-homer game on July 26 against the Chicago White Sox at Fenway Park. For the season, however, Vollmer leveled off to a .251 average (matching his career mark), although he set personal bests in homers (22) and RBI (85). Boston sent him back to the Senators in 1953, and he finished his MLB career in September 1954 as a reserve outfielder and pinch hitter. In his 685 games in the majors, Vollmer had 508 total hits, including 77 doubles, and 69 homers. Vollmer recorded a .984 fielding percentage at all three outfield positions.

Vollmer is one of only a handful of Major League Baseball players to hit a home run in their very first at bat.

Personal and later life
In 1947, Vollmer married and later had a daughter, Claudia. Vollmer retired from baseball and acquired the Lark Lounge, which he owned for 20 years. He later was a member of the American Legion, the Fraternal Order of Eagles, Cheviot Aerie No. 2197, and the Delhi Senior Citizens.

Vollmer died on October 2, 2006, at St. Luke Hospital in Florence, Kentucky. He is interred at Old St. Joseph's Cemetery in Cincinnati.

See also
 List of Major League Baseball players with a home run in their first major league at bat

References

External links

Clyde Vollmer at SABR (Baseball BioProject)

1921 births
2006 deaths
United States Army personnel of World War II
American people of German descent
Baseball players from Cincinnati
Bassett Furnituremakers players
Birmingham Barons players
Boston Red Sox players
Buffalo Bisons (minor league) players
Burials at Old St. Joseph's Cemetery
Charleston Senators players
Cincinnati Reds players
Columbia Reds players
Little Rock Travelers players
Major League Baseball outfielders
Montgomery Rebels players
Rochester Red Wings players
Syracuse Chiefs players
Washington Senators (1901–1960) players